No Marriage Ties is a 1933 American pre-Code drama film directed by J. Walter Ruben and written by Arthur Caesar, H.W. Hanemann, Sam Mintz. The film stars Richard Dix, Elizabeth Allan, Doris Kenyon, Alan Dinehart and David Landau. The film was released on August 8, 1933, by RKO Pictures.

Synopsis
A heavy-drinking journalist joins forces with a public relations man to form a successful advertising agency. Although the business becomes a success, it takes a toll on the ex-reporter's personal life.

Cast 
Richard Dix as Bruce Foster
Elizabeth Allan as Peggy Wilson
Doris Kenyon as Adrienne Deane
Alan Dinehart as 'Perk' Perkins
David Landau as Mr. Zimmer, Editor of 'The Reflector'
Hobart Cavanaugh as Smith
Hilda Vaughn as Fanny Olmstead, Foster's Secretary
Charles C. Wilson as Red Moran, City Desk Editor

References

External links 
 

1933 films
American black-and-white films
1930s English-language films
RKO Pictures films
Films directed by J. Walter Ruben
1933 drama films
American drama films
1930s American films